Landerdorf is a surname. Notable people with the surname include:

Ernst Ladendorf (born 1992), South African rugby union player
 Nicholas Ladendorf, former write-in candidate for U.S. Congress
Tyler Ladendorf (born 1988), American baseball player